Khaled Aziz Al-Thaker (born 14 July 1981) is a Saudi Arabian former footballer who played as a midfielder.

He played for the Saudi Arabia national team and was called up to the squad at the 2006 FIFA World Cup.

References

1981 births
Living people
Saudi Arabian footballers
2006 FIFA World Cup players
2007 AFC Asian Cup players
Saudi Arabia international footballers
Association football midfielders
Al Hilal SFC players
Al-Shabab FC (Riyadh) players
Al Nassr FC players
Sportspeople from Riyadh
Saudi Professional League players